CBS 6 may refer to one of the following television stations in the United States:
 KAUZ-TV, Wichita Falls, Texas
 KBSD-DT, Dodge City, Kansas (semi-satellite of KWCH-DT in Wichita, Kansas)
 KFDM, Beaumont/Port Arthur, Texas
 KOIN, Portland, Oregon
 KOTV-DT, Tulsa, Oklahoma
 KREZ-TV, 	Durango, Colorado (satellite of KRQE in Albuquerque, New Mexico)
 WCTV, Tallahassee, Florida (licensed to Thomasville, Georgia)
 WKMG-TV, Orlando, Florida
 WLNS-TV, Lansing/Jackson, Michigan
 WRGB, Albany, New York
 WTVR-TV, Richmond, Virginia

Formerly affiliated
 KCMC-TV (now KTAL-TV), Texarkana, Texas / Shreveport, Louisiana (1953 to 1961)
 KSPR-TV, Casper, Wyomning (1957 to 1959)
 KVIQ-LD, Eureka, California (1958 to 2008, now on channel 14)
 WCIX-TV, Miami, Florida (1989 to 1995; now on channel 4 as WFOR-TV)
 WDSM-TV (now KBJR-TV), Superior, Wisconsin / Duluth, Minnesota (1954 to 1955)
 WFBM-TV (now WRTV), Indianapolis, Indiana (1949 to 1956)
 WITI, Milwaukee, Wisconsin (1959 to 1961 and again from 1977 to 1994)
 WLNE-TV, Providence, Rhode Island (1977 to 1995)